"La Década Perdida" ("The Lost Decade") of Latin America is a Spanish term used to describe the economic crisis suffered in Latin America during the 1980s, which continued for some countries into the 1990s. In general, the crisis was composed of unpayable external debts, taxes, and volatile inflation and exchange rates, which in the majority of the countries in the region were fixed.

Overview 
During the 1970s, the rise in prices of raw materials (primarily oil) and the decrease in the value of the dollar caused US dollars to flow into Latin America, a region that then debated between an industrial model directed from the state or a market based model.

In 1980, the decreased price of raw materials and the rise of interest rates in the industrialized countries generated a lack of resources, which provoked a massive depreciation of exchange rates, appreciating the real interest rate on the debt, a situation made worse by the presence of excessively large bureaucracies.

In response to the crisis, the majority of the nations had to abandon their economic models of industrialization by substituting with imports, and they adopted a growth strategy oriented toward exports. This strategy was encouraged by the International Monetary Fund. There were exceptions, like Chile or Costa Rica, which briefly adopted reformist strategies. The real growth rate of gross domestic product (GDP) for the region was only 2.3% between 1980 and 1985. Between 1982 and 1985, Latin America paid 108 billion dollars in past debts.

In the beginning of the 1990s, Latin America was recuperating from the crisis, which nevertheless reconfigured the economic landscape of the region. The countries who previously were regional leaders like Argentina, Mexico, and Venezuela were left with diverse effects that hadn’t been overcome. Meanwhile countries that had fallen behind previously like Chile, Brazil, Peru, and Colombia stood out in the late 20th century with high economic growth and a better social wellbeing in relative terms.

The second "Década Perdida" 
Various publications, including El País and CNN en Español had indicated that the decade from 2012 marked a "second lost decade" for Latin America, due to the significant fall of the regional economic indices. During the second half of the decade, almost all the countries of the subcontinent traversed periods of no growth or an economic recession, which led to a turbulent political and social scene.

Between 2003 and 2012, Latin America lived through years of stability (which included a boom in some cases) due to the high demand for raw materials partly due to the Asian Market. This demand came primarily from China, which navigated the subprime crisis of 2008 with little difficulty. Benefitting from the weakening of the currencies from industrialized countries, they could obtain greater quantities of foreign currency. This period was known as the "gained decade," particularly by the center-left governments as a part of the "red tide" movement which had its best moment in that period.

However, the slowing down of China from 2012, and the consequent fall in the price of raw materials led to a new scenario. In 2011 the region had its last year of strong growth (greater than 4% annual), while 2012 was slightly better than 3% and between the years 2013 and 2015 it was below 2%. During the years 2016 and 2017 the economic activity in Latin America decreased for the first time since 2002, whereas in 2018 it barely passed 1%. The poverty in the subcontinent also grew starting in 2014, for the first time since the 1980s.

The effect of this situation was that Latin America lived through a "conservative wave" that included the general election of right leaning leaders in a region that during the previous century had for the most part elected left leaning governments. It was suggested that these aggressive political changes tended to strengthen exterior commerce and equilibrate fiscal accounts. However, the commercial war between the United States and China and a new increase in the value of the dollar worsened the regional economic situation in Latin America even more. In the last part of the 2010s, in various countries, there were diverse episodes of social disturbances.

Venezuela was the country most affected by the economic crisis due to a mix between an extreme dependence on petroleum (whose value plummeted between 2012 and 2015), inflation, a corrupt central bank, and a lack of economic support from foreign countries. This created a situation of catastrophic proportions, including industrial paralysis, shortages, and problems with public services.

Brazil, a country who had one of the largest increases on the global level during the 2000s, stayed immersed in a period of decrease starting in 2012. A situation influenced by the hosting of the World Cup in 2014 and the Olympics in 2016. The events organized in their nation generated a wave of protests, while between 2014 and 2016 the economy entered into a recession.

See also 
 Lost Decade (Peru)
 Chilean crisis of 1982
 Latin American debt crisis
 L-shaped recession
 El Caracazo
 Hyperinflation in Brazil

References

External links
 

Economic history of Mexico
Economic collapses
Inflation in Argentina
Inflation in Brazil
1980s economic history
1980s in Central America
1990s in Central America